Arvindsinh Damsinh Rathod was MLA from Kalol, Panchmahal Gujarat. He was belongs to Bharatiya Janata Party party. In 2007 He was elected as MLA from Kalol, Panchmahal.

President, Taluka Panchayat, Kalol, 2000-05.

Member, Executive Committee, District Panchayat, Bakrol since 2006.

Chairman, Executive Committee, District Panchayat, Panchmahals.

Vice President, Taluka Panchayat, Kalol, 1995-2005.

General Secretary, Kalol Taluka Bharatiya Janata Party, 1990-96.
General Secretary, Panchmahals District Baxi-Panch Morcho, 2001-04.

Secretary, Kalol Taluka Bharatiya Janata Party, 1987-90.

Member, Kalol Gram Panchayat, 1990-95.

Active Member of Bharatiya Janata Party since 1987.

He has led and undertaken the responsibilities of national and regional programmes of Bharatiya Janata Party and also in social and educational organizations and Yuvak Mandals.

He organizes 101 group marriage ceremonies and has been active in curbing down the social evils and vices.

References

1958 births
Living people
People from Panchmahal district
Bharatiya Janata Party politicians from Gujarat